Stockholmsåsen, is a  long esker stretching from southern Uppland to northeastern Södermanland, in Stockholm County, Sweden. The esker extends from Arlanda to Jordbro and Västerhaninge, passing through Stockholm where it is known as Brunkebergsåsen.

See also 
 Brunkebergsåsen

Uppland
Södermanland
Eskers of Sweden